Astragalus chrysostachys is a species of milkvetch in the family Fabaceae.

References

chrysostachys
Taxa named by Pierre Edmond Boissier